The 2016 Texas Southern Tigers football team represented Texas Southern University in the 2016 NCAA Division I FCS football season. The Tigers were led by first-year head coach Michael Haywood and played their home games at a BBVA Compass Stadium. They were a member of the West Division of the Southwestern Athletic Conference (SWAC). They finished the season 4–7, 4–5 in SWAC play to finish in fourth place in the West Division.

Schedule

 * Games will air on a tape delayed basis

References

Texas Southern
Texas Southern Tigers football seasons
Texas Southern Tigers football